Warboys is an English surname, originally either an occupational name for a forester, or a name given to people from Warboys, Cambridgeshire. Notable people with the surname include:

 Alan Warboys (born 1949), English footballer
 Brian Warboys (born 1942), British computer scientist
 Mrs Warboys, character in British sitcom One Foot in the Grave

References

See also 

 Worboys

Surnames
English toponymic surnames
Occupational surnames
English-language surnames
Surnames of English origin
Surnames of British Isles origin